= Marcan Tiger Preserve =

Coordinates: 27.3299°N 82.5382°W

The Marcan Tiger Preserve is located in the panhandle of Florida, and covers 78 acres (320,000 m^{2}). It was created by Dr. Josip Marcan, an expert on tigers. The preserve is mainly dedicated to the critically endangered Bengal tiger.
